Roussopoulos is a Greek surname and may refer to:

Athanasios Roussopoulos (1903–1983), Greek scientist
Carole Roussopoulos (1945–2009), Swiss film director and feminist
Dimitrios Roussopoulos (born 1936), political activist, ecologist, and writer
Theodoros Roussopoulos (born 1963), Greek politician

Greek-language surnames
Surnames